Aedava (also known as Aedeva, Aedabe, Aedeba, Aedadeba) was a Dacian settlement located south of the Danube in Moesia (present-day northern Bulgaria). In his De Aedificiis, the 6th century AD historian Procopius placed Aedava on the Danubian road between Augustae and Variana. He also mentioned that Emperor Justinian (r. 527–565) restored the damaged portion of the town defenses.

See also 
 Dacia
 Moesia
 List of ancient cities in Thrace and Dacia

Notes

References

Ancient

Modern

External links 
 

Dacian towns
Ancient Thrace
Roman towns and cities in Bulgaria
Former populated places in Bulgaria
Moesia